Keon Tyrese Ellis (born January 8, 2000) is an American professional basketball player for the Sacramento Kings of the National Basketball Association (NBA), on a two-way contract with the Stockton Kings of the NBA G League. He played college basketball for the Florida SouthWestern Buccaneers and the Alabama Crimson Tide.

High school career
Ellis played basketball for Eustis High School in his hometown of Eustis, Florida before transferring to Leesburg High School in Leesburg, Florida for his junior season. He led Leesburg to back-to-back Class 6A state titles. As a senior, Ellis averaged 12.7 points, 11 rebounds, and two assists per game, helping his team achieve a 29–1 record. He signed to play college basketball for Gardner–Webb but instead opted to join Florida SouthWestern, a junior college program, for academic reasons.

College career
As a freshman at Florida SouthWestern, Ellis averaged 8.3 points and three rebounds per game, earning Second Team All-Suncoast Conference honors. On January 4, 2020, he scored a school-record 41 points in a 92–77 win against St. Petersburg College. In his sophomore season, Ellis averaged 18.1 points, 4.3 rebounds, 2.2 assists and 2.1 steals per game, setting program single-season records in points and steals. He was recognized as a Second Team NJCAA Division I All-American and Suncoast Player of the Year. For his junior season, Ellis moved to Alabama, choosing the Crimson Tide over Iowa State, Kansas State and Western Kentucky. 

He averaged 5.5 points and four rebounds per game as a junior. Ellis was named to the SEC All-Defensive Team as a senior. He averaged 12.1 points, 6.1 rebounds and two steals per game.

Professional career
After going undrafted in the 2022 NBA draft, Ellis signed a two-way contract with the Sacramento Kings.

Ellis played in seven total games during the 2022 NBA Summer League, averaging 11.4 points on 44.1% shooting from the field and an impressive 46.9% clip from deep, 3.6 rebounds, 3.3 assists, and 2.0 steals per game.

Career statistics

College

NCAA Division I

|-
| style="text-align:left;"| 2020–21
| style="text-align:left;"| Alabama
| 32 || 7 || 17.5 || .504 || .389 || .723 || 4.0 || 1.1 || 1.1 || .4 || 5.5

JUCO

|-
| style="text-align:left;"| 2018–19
| style="text-align:left;"| Florida SouthWestern
| 33 || 6 || 18.3 || .442 || .291 || .767 || 3.0 || 2.2 || 1.5 || .6 || 8.3
|-
| style="text-align:left;"| 2019–20
| style="text-align:left;"| Florida SouthWestern
| 31 || 26 || 27.6 || .536 || .401 || .807 || 4.3 || 2.2 || 2.1 || 1.2 || 18.1
|- class="sortbottom"
| style="text-align:center;" colspan="2"| Career
| 64 || 32 || 22.8 || .501 || .371 || .791 || 3.7 || 2.2 || 1.8 || .9 || 13.1

Personal life
Ellis' older brother, Antwon Clayton, played college basketball for Jacksonville before turning professional.

References

External links
Alabama Crimson Tide bio
Florida SouthWestern Buccaneers bio

2000 births
Living people
Alabama Crimson Tide men's basketball players
American men's basketball players
Basketball players from Florida
Junior college men's basketball players in the United States
People from Eustis, Florida
Sacramento Kings players
Shooting guards
Stockton Kings players
Undrafted National Basketball Association players